The Golden Leaf Moth (Wingia aurata) is a moth of the family Oecophoridae. It is found in Southern and Eastern Australia.

The wingspan is 30–35 mm.

References

Oecophorinae